Liverpool Sound Collage is an album by Paul McCartney released in 2000. The album is also credited to the Beatles, Super Furry Animals and Youth; but because McCartney was so heavily involved in its creation, in addition to his production credit, Liverpool Sound Collage is filed under his name.

Asked by artist Peter Blake to create something musical and with a Liverpool spirit to it, in order to complement his concurrent artwork exhibition, McCartney ended up harking all the way back to session chatter by the Beatles (hence their "involvement") and using snippets of his 1991 classical piece Paul McCartney's Liverpool Oratorio to create the tracks for the album. On the track "Made Up" he also can be heard walking the streets and asking various pedestrians to give their impressions of Liverpool and the Beatles. The album also incorporates chopped up beats and digital manipulation of assorted sound clips.

Liverpool Sound Collage was nominated for the 2001 Grammy Award for Best Alternative Music Album.

In return for being permitted to remix some Beatles music for the album, McCartney was asked to perform on the Super Furry Animals' next album, Rings Around the World, on which he is credited as providing "celery and carrot" on "Receptacle for the Respectable".

In 2017, it was revealed the chorus of "Free Now" was taken from Take 9 of the title track from Sgt. Pepper's Lonely Hearts Club Band.

Track listing
"Plastic Beetle" – 8:23
 Paul McCartney, The Beatles
"Peter Blake 2000" – 16:54
 Super Furry Animals, The Beatles
"Real Gone Dub Made in Manifest in the Vortex of the Eternal Now" – 16:37
 Youth
"Made Up" – 12:58
 Paul McCartney, The Beatles
"Free Now" – 3:29
 Paul McCartney, The Beatles, Super Furry Animals

References

Paul McCartney albums
2000 remix albums
Electronic albums by English artists
Capitol Records albums
Albums produced by Paul McCartney
The Beatles music
EMI Records albums
Musique concrète albums
Sound collage albums